Adale District is a district in the southeastern Middle Shabelle (Shabeellaha Dhexe) region of Somalia. Its capital lies at Adale.

References

External links
 Administrative map of Adale District

Districts of Somalia

Middle Shabelle